Quartier-Français is a village on the island of Réunion, located on its northeastern coast in the commune of Sainte-Suzanne.

Populated places in Réunion